"What Would Steve Do?" is the second single released by Mumm-Ra on Columbia Records, which was released on February 19, 2007. It is a re-recorded version of the self-release they did in April 2006. It reached #40 in the UK Singles Chart, making it their highest charting single.

Track listings
All songs written by Mumm-Ra.

CD
"What Would Steve Do?"
"Cute As"
"Without You"

7"
"What Would Steve Do?"
"What Would Steve Do? (Floorboard Mix)"

Gatefold 7"
"What Would Steve Do?"
"Cute As"

References

2007 singles
Mumm-Ra (band) songs
2006 songs
Columbia Records singles